Ynnakh Mountain, also known as Arga Ynnakh Khaya, Gora Ulakhan Ynnakh and as Mother Mountain, is a mountain in Verkhoyansky District, Yakutia, Russian Federation. 

The mountain has been classified as a natural monument of Russia with number 1420068.

Geography
Ynnakh Mountain is a granite massif located north of the Yana Plateau between the Yana River and the Adycha, a right hand tributary of the Yana. The mountain rises at the western limit of the Chersky Range, near the eastern foothills of the Verkhoyansk Range , a few miles to the southeast of Ese-Khayya. 

The height of the summit is  according to the Operational Navigation Chart. The mineral kesterite is found in the mountain. 

There is sparse forest in the lower slopes and at the feet of the mountain. Mid and higher elevations have mountain tundra with mosses and lichens.

See also
List of mountains in Russia

References

External links

Beauty to share - Yakutia
Arga-Ynnakh-Khaya granite Massif, Yana-Adycha Region
Wolframoixiolite in lithium-fluoric granites of the Arga-Ynnakh-Khaysky massif, Yakutia

Mountains of the Sakha Republic
Chersky Range
Natural monuments
Yakut culture